The 1990–91 Eliteserien season was the 34th season of ice hockey in Denmark. Eight teams participated in the league, and Herning IK won the championship. Rungsted IK was relegated to the 1. division.

Regular season

Playoffs
The top 4 teams from the regular season qualified for the playoffs. Herning IK defeated the Rødovre Mighty Bulls in the final, and AaB Ishockey defeated Herlev IK in the 3rd place game.

External links
Season on eliteprospects.com

Dan
1990-91
1990 in Danish sport
1991 in Danish sport